Men of Steel may refer to:

 "Men of Steel" (song), a 1997 single by rappers, Shaquille O'Neal, Ice Cube, B-Real, Peter Gunz and KRS-One
 Men of Steel (1926 film), a 1926 American silent drama film
 Men of Steel (1932 film), a 1932 British drama film
 Bill Cracks Down, also known as Men of Steel, a 1937 American film directed by William Nigh

See also
 Man of Steel (disambiguation)